Raj Singh II  (25 April 1743 – 3 April 1761), was the Maharana of Mewar Kingdom (r. 1754–1762). He was a son of Maharana Pratap Singh II.

References 

Mewar dynasty
1743 births
1761 deaths